The 2012 World Junior Ice Hockey Championship Division I was played in two groups of six teams each. In each group the first-placed team is promoted to a higher level, while the last-placed team is relegated to a lower level. This year, for the first time, the winner of Group B is promoted to Group A and the winner of Group A is promoted to the next year's top division. Previously the winners of both groups were promoted to the top division.

Division I A
The Division I A tournament was played in Garmisch-Partenkirchen, Germany, from 11 to 17 December 2011.

Participants

Final standings

Results

Top 10 scorers

Goaltending leaders 
(minimum 40% team's total ice time)

IIHF Best Players awards
 Goaltender:  Mathias Niederberger
 Defenceman:  Konrad Abeltshauser
 Forward:  Sondre Olden

Division I A Champion

Division I B
The Division I B tournament was played in Tychy, Poland, from 12 to 18 December 2011.

Participants

Final standings

Results

Top 10 scorers

Goaltending leaders 
(minimum 40% team's total ice time)

IIHF Best Players awards

 Goaltender:  Pavel Poluektov
 Defenceman:  Aziz Baazzi
 Forward:  Borna Rendulic

Division I B Champion

References

External links
IIHF.com

I
World Junior Ice Hockey Championships – Division I
World
International ice hockey competitions hosted by Germany
International ice hockey competitions hosted by Poland
World